Rachel Wainer Apter (born July 22, 1980) is an American lawyer who serves as an associate justice of the Supreme Court of New Jersey.

Early life and education 
Wainer Apter grew up in Rockaway, New Jersey, where she attended Morris Hills High School. She graduated summa cum laude from the University of Pennsylvania and received her Juris Doctor magna cum laude from Harvard Law School, graduating in 2007.

Career 
After law school, Wainer Apter clerked for U.S. District Court Judge Jed S. Rakoff in the United States District Court for the Southern District of New York, and then for Chief Judge Robert Katzmann of the United States Court of Appeals for the Second Circuit. She then went on to clerk for Associate Justice Ruth Bader Ginsburg of the Supreme Court of the United States. Wainer Apter worked as an attorney at the ACLU. She then became the director of the New Jersey Division of Civil Rights.

On March 15, 2021, governor Phil Murphy nominated Wainer Apter to be an associate justice of the Supreme Court of New Jersey. If confirmed, Wainer Apter would replace retiring Justice Jaynee LaVecchia.  Her nomination expired in 2021 due to Senator Holly Schepisi refusing to give senatorial consent and blocking her nomination. In January 2022, Schepisi suggested she may be open to supporting Wainer Apter's nomination. On January 11, 2022, Governor Murphy renominated Wainer Apter. On October 13, 2022, her nomination was voted out of committee by an 8–3 vote, after Republicans voiced their concern over her time with her time as a director of the civil rights division of the New Jersey Attorney General's office and staff attorney for the ACLU. On October 17, 2022, her nomination was confirmed by a 23–14 vote. She was sworn into office on October 21, 2022.

Personal life 
A resident of Englewood, New Jersey, Wainer Apter and her husband have three children.

See also 
 List of law clerks of the Supreme Court of the United States (Seat 6)

References 

Living people
21st-century American lawyers
21st-century American women lawyers
21st-century American women judges
21st-century American judges
American women judges
Harvard Law School alumni
Law clerks of the Supreme Court of the United States
American civil rights lawyers
Justices of the Supreme Court of New Jersey
New Jersey lawyers
People from Englewood, New Jersey
People from Rockaway, New Jersey
University of Pennsylvania alumni
Year of birth missing (living people)
Place of birth missing (living people)
1980 births